Disney XD was an Italian television channel aimed primarily at children and teenagers, specifically boys. The channel was owned by Walt Disney Television Italia, a subsidiary of Disney. The channel was launched exclusively on the Sky Italia platform on 28 September 2009, and closed on 1 October 2019.

The channel's official announcer was the voice actor Maurizio Merluzzo.

History

Fox Kids/Jetix
The channel launched as Fox Kids on 1 April 2000. In the Summer of 2001, a Fox Kids programming block was added to syndicated television stations in the country including Antenna 3, Lombardia and Super 3, airing for one hour a day from 6pm-7pm, before extending a half hour in September 2002 to start at 5:30pm, with a 6:45am-8am morning slot added. A one-hour timeshift launched on July 31, 2003.

With the Jetix rebranding, Fox Kids launched a Jetix-branded primetime block that ran from 7pm-10:30pm every day in mid-2004. the syndicated Fox Kids block was separated and rebranded as K-2 in October 2004 In 2009, it was launched as its own digital terrestrial television channel., and the Fox Kids channel was rebranded as Jetix on 1 March 2005.

In May 2005, a sister channel aimed at a male teenage audience - GXT, was launched, exclusively for Sky Italia.

In October 2006, a Italian version of Jetix Magazine launched.

On 1 July 2009, K-2 re-launched as a standalone free-to-air television channel, and was rebranded as K2.

As Disney XD
On 15 July 2009, it was announced that the Italian subsidiary of Jetix Europe, Jetix Italy S.r.l., would undergo a management buyout under the name of Switchover Media, and would purchase the GXT and K2 networks and blocks from The Walt Disney Company. The company also agreed to operate Jetix Italy for Disney until its rebranding as Disney XD Italy would go to fruition.

On 7 September 2009, it was officially announced that the rebranding to Disney XD would occur on 28 September 2009, and on that date, channel operations transferred from Switchover Media to The Walt Disney Company Italia.

On 1 October 2011, Disney XD +2, a two-hour time shift of the channel, was launched. The channel also switched to the 16:9 widescreen ratio on 9 May 2012. On 15 September in the same year, a high definition simulcast was also launched.

From 8 to 21 June 2015, the channel's +2 timeshift temporarily rebranded to a pop-up channel solely airing Hannah Montana.

References

Disney XD
Italian-language television stations
Television channels and stations established in 2009
2009 establishments in Italy
2019 disestablishments in Italy
Television channels and stations disestablished in 2019
Defunct television channels in Italy